Crynfryn is a hamlet bach in the  community of Nantcwnlle, Ceredigion, Wales, which is 64.6 miles (104 km) from Cardiff and 175.7 miles (282.8 km) from London. Crynfryn is represented in the Senedd by Elin Jones (Plaid Cymru) and is part of the Ceredigion constituency in the House of Commons.

See also
List of localities in Wales by population

References

Villages in Ceredigion